The Monaco men's national basketball team is the national basketball team of the Principality of Monaco. Monaco has competed at the Games of the Small States of Europe, and winning gold in 1987.

Competitive record

References

External links
Monaco at Facebook.com 
Monaco at FIBA site

Basketball in Monaco
Men's national basketball teams
National sports teams of Monaco